Çinarlı (known as Georgsfeld until 1932 and Leninfeld or Lenin until 1992) is a village and municipality in the Shamkir Region of Azerbaijan.  It has a population of 3,739.

References 

Populated places in Shamkir District